Levan Zhorzholiani (born 20 January 1988) is a Georgian judoka.

Achievements

External links
 
 

1988 births
Living people
Male judoka from Georgia (country)
Olympic judoka of Georgia (country)
Judoka at the 2008 Summer Olympics
Judoka at the 2012 Summer Olympics